John Langwith, Sr. (c.1723 – 1795) was an English carpenter and architect who worked in Grantham, Lincolnshire. His son John Langwith Jr.  (c1753-1825) was also an architect who worked in Grantham.

Work by John Langwith
In 1785, Langwith was one of the three architects who submitted designs for the County Gaol in Lincoln Castle, but the work was awarded to William Lumby.
Syston New Hall, Lincolnshire. He worked on the new building for Sir John Thorold between 1766 and 1775 and the north wing was built ‘‘according to a plan by John Langwith’’  Syston New Hall was demolished c. 1930. 

George Hotel, Grantham 1780. An important coaching inn on the Great North Road
Vine house, Vine street. Grantham. 1764. This building has been attributed to John Langwith, senior,

Literature
Antram N (revised), Pevsner N & Harris J, (1989), The Buildings of England: Lincolnshire, Yale University Press. 
Colvin H. A (1995), Biographical Dictionary of British Architects 1600-1840. Yale University Press, 3rd edition London, pg.599.
Worsley G.(1987). Georgian Buildings in Grantham , Country Life, 4th. June.

References

1795 deaths
19th-century English architects
Architects from Lincolnshire
Year of birth uncertain